Kraken Catena is a crater chain (catena) on Triton, the largest natural satellite of Neptune.  It is named after the Kraken of Norse mythology; the name was approved by the International Astronomical Union in 1991.  It is located at 14°N, 35.5°E.

See also
List of geological features on Triton

References

Surface features of Neptune's moons
Triton (moon)